The Kincaid Mounds Historic Site (11MX2-11; 11PO2-10) , is a Mississippian culture archaeological site located at the southern tip of present-day U.S. state of Illinois, along the Ohio River. Kincaid Mounds has been notable for both its significant role in native North American prehistory and for the central role the site has played in the development of modern archaeological techniques. The site had at least 11 substructure platform mounds (it ranks fifth among known sites of this period for the number of such structures), and 8 other monuments.

Artifacts from the settlement link its major habitation and the construction of the mounds to the Mississippian culture period. It is 140 miles from Cahokia, the major center of Mississippian culture in North America. The Kincaid site was also occupied earlier by indigenous peoples of the Late Woodland period. The site was declared a National Historic Landmark in 1964 for its significance as a major Native American mound center and prehistoric trading center along the Ohio River.

Introduction

Built in the floodplain adjacent to the Ohio River, the site straddles modern-day Massac and Pope counties in deep southern Illinois. This area is colloquially known as Little Egypt. The Kincaid site was the subject of major excavations by the University of Chicago from 1934–1941, during which a number of anthropologists and archaeologists who later had notable careers were trained under the direction of Fay-Cooper Cole; they included Richard MacNeish, discoverer of the origins of maize. Since 2003 investigation of the site with new technology and excavations by teams from Southern Illinois University have yielded significant new data, including identification of another mound.

The Illinois Historic Preservation Agency owns and operates an area including several mounds in Massac County related to the Kincaid site. This includes the majority of the estimated  area contained within a wooden palisade, as well as an undefined area of additional occupation to the west. The Pope County portion of the site is privately owned.

When the University of Chicago excavated Kincaid in the 1930s and 1940s, their team identified nine mounds on the site's Massac County portion. In 2003, a tenth mound was identified. It is a small mound that was later covered with a midden, and it lies along the current road near the county line on the southeastern corner of the town plaza.  Chicago archaeologists had excavated around this mound, but they chose to exclude it from their list of possible mounds due to a lack of clarity about its identity. Identification of this portion of the site as an artificial earthwork came after Southern Illinois University returned to the site in 2003 to re-excavate the hills that were thought to be possible mounds.

History of Kincaid

The Chicago excavators in the 1930s documented a prehistory in the Kincaid area stretching back thousands of years, into what is now known as the Archaic Period (8000 to 2000 BCE). The Chicago crew recognized this period as the Faulkner Component, which was described as a pre-pottery culture.  Except for the lack of pottery, archeologically the evidence showed that it was otherwise very like the subsequent cultures of the Early Woodland, such as the Adena culture (1000 to 200 BCE).

Teams documented more intensive occupation in the ensuing Early Woodland and Middle Woodland periods. It was similar to the contemporaneous Adena and Hopewell cultures that began during this time period throughout eastern North America. This involved a more sedentary lifestyle and a semi-agricultural culture characterized by the use of limestone-tempered ceramics and the presence of semi-permanent housing. The extensive occupation is chronologically classified as the Baumer phase (a local variation of the Crab Orchard culture). The Baumer-phase occupants of Kincaid used no Havana Hopewell culture motifs when decorating their pottery, as did other Crab Orchard peoples,  but used cord and fabric marking. They also preferred more limestone and grog tempering in their clay paste. Excavations prior to construction of an informational kiosk and viewing platform in 2003 revealed six Baumer-phase pit features dating to 250 BCE to 1 CE. One of the pits contained the intentionally buried remains of a small domestic dog, a rare find for the area.

Occupation continued into the Late Woodland period. This period is known as the Lewis culture.

But, the most notable occupation at Kincaid was during the period of the Mississippian culture, which developed from the local Lewis community about 1050 CE. The people at Kincaid built at least 19 earthwork mounds during this period, mostly the characteristic Mississippian platform mounds. Since 2003 teams from Southern Illinois University have been conducting more intensive research at the site.

Although none of Kincaid's earthworks rivals the size of Monks Mound at Cahokia, the largest is very big by Mississippian standards and ranks 12th in size among all known Mississippian mounds. The overall site ranks 5th in size among the Mississippian sites, in terms of the number of mounds constructed at the site.

Remains of large buildings atop the main mounds seemed to indicate temples or council houses. Carved figurines in coal and fluorite seemed to characterize the local iconography, with images showing connections to the Southeastern Ceremonial Complex (SECC). Trade for chert resources appeared to extend into Missouri, Tennessee, and other parts of Illinois. Several examples of Mill Creek chert, which came from quarries very near by, were found at the site. Mississippian culture pottery painted with a negative resist are also characteristic of the site.

In the 1930s, the Chicago team excavated a major burial mound, Pope Mound 2, yielding further evidence for hierarchical social structures and Kincaid's status as a chiefdom. The mound contained a number of stone box graves and log-lined tombs, similar to those frequently found to the south in the Middle Cumberland Valley of Tennessee.

Mississippian culture occupation at the site appears to have ended by 1400–1450 CE. No documented occupation of the site by historic Native American tribes exists. The site was evidently abandoned, perhaps because of exhaustion of timber and game resources. It remained uninhabited for three centuries, until the arrival of American settlers. Most of these settlers arrived more than 400 years after the site was abandoned.

Kincaid focus

In the lower Ohio River valley in Illinois, Kentucky, and Indiana, the Mississippian-culture towns of Kincaid, Wickliffe, Tolu, and Angel Mounds have been grouped together into a "Kincaid focus" set, due to similarities in pottery assemblages and site plans. Most striking are the comparisons between the Kincaid and Angel sites, which include analogous site plans, stylistic similarities in artifacts, and geographic closeness. These connections have led some experts to hypothesize that the builders and residents were of the same society. 
The 300–400 year span in which these types of artifacts and sites are found is called the "Angel phase".  It is divided into three subphases: 

  
Rare painted and incised sherds of Mississippian-culture pottery have been found at all four sites, ranging from less than one percent near Kincaid to about three or four percent of the assemblage at Wickliffe. Some common pottery styles found in these sites include: Angel Negative Painted, Kincaid Negative Painted, and Matthews Incised. This pottery is shell tempered and ranges from the smoothed surface and coarser temper of Mississippi Ware to the more polished surface and finer temper of Bell Ware.

See also
 Mississippi Valley: Culture, phase, and chronological periods table – List of archaeological periods
 List of archaeological sites on the National Register of Historic Places in Illinois
 List of Mississippian sites

References

Further reading

External links

 The Kincaid Mounds
 Kincaid Mounds, Illinois Historic Preservation Agency

Middle Mississippian culture
Archaeological sites on the National Register of Historic Places in Illinois
National Historic Landmarks in Illinois
Illinois State Historic Sites
Protected areas of Massac County, Illinois
Protected areas of Pope County, Illinois
Mounds in Illinois
National Register of Historic Places in Massac County, Illinois
National Register of Historic Places in Pope County, Illinois
1964 establishments in Illinois